New Ways Ministry is a ministry of advocacy and justice for lesbian, gay, bisexual, and transgender Catholics. The national organization is primarily based in the state of Maryland. It was one of the earliest groups attempting to broaden the way Catholics have traditionally dealt with LGBT issues, and was established by Sister Jeannine Gramick and Father Robert Nugent.

In 2021, Pope Francis addressed two letters to New Ways Ministry, in which he commended the organization for its outreach to the LGBTQ community and referred to one of its co-founders, Loretto Sr. Jeannine Gramick, as "a valiant woman" who had suffered much for her ministry. He also said he is aware that New Ways Ministry's "history has not been an easy one," but that loving one's neighbor is still the second commandment, tied "necessarily" to the first commandment to love God, while thanking them for "their neighborly work."

History
New Ways Ministry was founded in 1977 by Sr. Jeannine Gramick, a Catholic religious sister, and Fr. Robert Nugent, a Catholic priest. The ministry expanded their existing work of writing and speaking on homosexuality in the years following 1971, with the aim of creating acceptance for gay and lesbian Catholics within the Roman Catholic Church. 

It adopted its name from the pastoral letter of Bishop Francis Mugavero of the Diocese of Brooklyn, "Sexuality: God's Gift". Written in 1976, the letter addressed gay and lesbian Catholics,
as well as the widowed, adolescents, the divorced, and those having sexual relations outside of marriage, stating: " ...we pledge our willingness to help you ...to try to find new ways to communicate the truth of Christ because we believe it will make you free."  These sentiments inspired the pastoral efforts by the co-founders to build bridges between differing constituencies in Catholicism.

In 1975, Nugent left the Archdiocese and joined the staff of the Quixote Center in Maryland. In 1977, he joined the Salvatorians, that same year he founded New Ways Ministry with Gramick. "We knew it was risky," he told the St. Petersburg Times in 1999, "because Catholics weren't talking and writing about sexuality." 

Nugent served as a consultant for the U.S. Conference of Catholic Bishops on its 1997 pastoral document on homosexuality, "Always Our Children."

Mission and work

New Ways Ministry advocates for acceptance of LGBT people among Catholics and among the general population. In the belief that homophobia and transphobia stem from a lack of understanding, New Ways Ministry focuses on educating families, churches, and communities through dialogue, publications and research, and educational programming. Publications have included responses to Vatican Instructions, "Homosexuality: A Positive Catholic Perspective" and "Marriage Equality: A Positive Catholic Approach," and symposia on the issue of homosexuality in the Catholic church have hosted speakers including Bishop Thomas Gumbleton of the Archdiocese of Detroit and Bishop Matthew Clark of the Diocese of Rochester. They also organize Catholics nationally in support of marriage equality initiatives.

Partnerships 
New Ways Ministry partners with Equally Blessed, a coalition of Catholics who support full LGBT equality, and the Global Network of Rainbow Catholics.

Criticism 
In 1984 Cardinal James Hickey barred the organization from the Archdiocese of Washington because of its dissent from traditional Catholic teaching on the issue of homosexuality, which condemns sexual activity between people of the same gender. The same year, the Vatican ordered co-founders Nugent and Gramick to resign from New Ways Ministry. Both continued publishing, speaking, and ministering around gay and lesbian issues within the Catholic Church until 1999.

That year, the Congregation for the Doctrine of the Faith, then under the leadership of Cardinal Joseph Ratzinger, condemned the organization’s positions on homosexuality, and ordered co-founders Gramick and Nugent to cease pastoral ministry within the gay and lesbian community.   Fr. Nugent returned to parish-based ministry, but Sr. Gramick refused to comply. While he stepped back from public ministry, Nugent continued to counsel gay and lesbian Catholics privately, and advised theologians and scholars working on issues of homosexuality. He also wrote of Pierre Teilhard de Chardin and Thomas Merton.

In 2010, Cardinal Francis George, Archbishop of Chicago and President of the U.S. Conference of Catholic Bishops (USCCB), stated New Ways did not present an authentic view of Catholic teaching. Instead he insisted that it "confuses the faithful about the Church’s efforts to defend traditional marriage and to minister to homosexual persons". In March 2011 the USCCB affirmed George's statement and reiterated "...that in no manner is the position proposed by New Ways Ministry in conformity with Catholic teaching and in no manner is this organization authorized to speak on behalf of the Catholic Church or to identify itself as a Catholic organization."

In 2011, the United States Conference of Catholic Bishops stated that "in no manner is the position proposed by New Ways Ministry in conformity with Catholic teaching and in no manner is this organization authorized to speak on behalf of the Catholic Church or to identify itself as a Catholic organization."

Nugent's death 
Nugent retired in June 2013, and died of lung cancer at the age of 76 on January 1, 2014 in Milwaukee, Wisconsin, location of the US Province of Salvatorians. Some of Nugent's papers are in the Special Collections of Marquette University.

Pope Francis 
In 2015, a group of 50 LGBT activists and pilgrims were given first row seating at a wednesday papal audience in St. Peter’s Square, Rome.

In 2021, Pope Francis addressed two letters to New Ways Ministry, in which he commended the organization for its outreach to the LGBTQ community and referred to one of its co-founders, Loretto Sr. Jeannine Gramick, as "a valiant woman" who had suffered much for her ministry. He also said he is aware that New Ways Ministry's "history has not been an easy one," but that loving one's neighbor is still the second commandment, tied "necessarily" to the first commandment to love God, while thanking them for "their neighborly work".

See also 
LGBT-welcoming church programs
DignityUSA
Mary Hunt
Donna Quinn
Homosexuality and Roman Catholicism
Courage International
Joel 2:25 International
Ministry to Persons with a Homosexual Inclination
On the Pastoral Care of Homosexual Persons
Dissent from Catholic teaching on homosexuality

References

External links
New Ways Ministry website
New Ways Ministry Records
Notification of the Congregation for the Doctrine of the Faith, May 31, 1999
"USCCB President Clarifies Status Of New Ways Ministry", Cardinal Francis George, Archbishop of Chicago and President of the United States Conference of Catholic Bishops, Feb. 12, 2010
"Statement on New Ways Ministry", Cardinal Edwin O'Brien, Archbishop of Baltimore, March 12, 2012
Vatican - official website full Catechism

LGBT and Catholicism
LGBT Christian organizations
Catholic dissident organizations